The 2016–17 Derde Divisie season is the first edition of the new Dutch fourth tier, formerly called Topklasse, since the restructuring of the league system in the summer of 2016.

This change in the league system was approved in a KNVB assembly in December 2014. A new semi-professional level Tweede Divisie was added at the third tier, thus the Derde Divisie and leagues below it decremented by one level, and furthermore, promotion and relegation between the Tweede Divisie and the new Derde Divisie became effective.

Teams

Saturday league

Sunday league

League tables

Saturday league

Sunday league

Promotion/relegation play-offs Tweede and Derde Divisie

The numbers 15 and 16 from the 2016–17 Tweede Divisie and three (substitute) period winners of each of the 2016–17 Derde Divisie's, making a total of eight teams, decide in a 2-round knockout system in which two teams will play next season in the 2017–18 Tweede Divisie. The remaining six teams will play next season in the 2017–18 Derde Divisie.

Qualified Teams

Results

* Promotion to Tweede Divisie

First round

Match A

Match B

Match C

Match D

Final round

Match E

Match F

Promotion/relegation play-offs Derde Divisie and Hoofdklasse

The numbers 15 and 16 from the 2016–17 Derde Divisie Saturday league and 3 (substitute) period winners of each of the two 2016–17 Hoofdklasse Saturday leagues, making a total of 8 teams, decided in a 2-round knockout system which 2 teams play next season in the 2017–18 Derde Divisie Saturday league. The remaining 6 teams play next season in the 2017–18 Hoofdklasse Saturday leagues.

The same applied for the 2016–17 Derde Divisie Sunday league and each of the two 2016–17 Hoofdklasse Sunday leagues.

See Hoofdklasse promotion play-offs.

References

Derde Divisie seasons
4
Ned